Generalmusic was an Italian musical instrument manufacturing company focusing on digital and acoustic pianos, synthesizers and music workstations. The company produced three lines: a musical instrument series called GEM, a various studio equipment series called LEM and electric organs/synthesizers called ELKA. It was founded in 1987 and ceased business in 2009 before becoming bankrupt in 2011.

History

Early Years
Generalmusic's first arranger workstation models were their WS series, released in 1990. Featuring a 5-track sequencer, 32 built-in arranger styles, and 32 user-programmable styles, they predated the General MIDI standard. This limited easy interoperability with other devices. The WX series (released in 1993) did implement General MIDI, offered a large blue LCD display, a user-friendly interface and some vintage synth sound presets like Oberheim, ARP 2600, Prophet or Elka Synthex. Although designed as arranger workstations, WX series had some professional synthesizer capabilities like filter and cutoff (resonance) editing with an integrated powerful 16-track sequencer. The company also offered more sophisticated versions of the WX series as S series synthesizers. The S2 was similar to a Kurzweil K2000 for its functionalities such as optional sampling, and layout and patch manipulation.

Generalmusic bought the GEM company, which had itself bought Elka-Orla, a piano and organ maker that transitioned into synthesizers in the 1970s. The Synthex is the best known of a range of Elka instruments.

After 1990
From the 1990s to 2000, Generalmusic made a physically modeled, digital half-rack piano module called the RealPiano Expander. It featured realistic, physically modelled grand pianos with continuous damper pedal functionality. The RealPiano Expander has a delicate LCD readout that is prone to failure. This is due to the internal placement of the LCD ribbon wire in proximity to the top front edge of the plastic front bezel. To prevent damage to the LCD ribbon wire, users should not place heavy objects on top of the module. Users have replaced the LCD ribbon wire themselves. A damaged LCD ribbon wire does not affect sound quality or other functions at all. The device also has a few bugs related to key velocity that were never corrected in the upgradable EPROM firmware.

The RealPiano Expander was succeeded by the GEM RP-X half-rack module in 2006. The RP-X featured the DRAKE (DSP RISC Advanced Keyboard Engine) which simulates a Fazioli F308 and Steinway & Sons grand piano among other instruments.

The last generation of Generalmusic synthesizers is the Genesys series, offering onboard sampling from an integrated CD-ROM, audio sequencer tracks, and flash ROM. In addition to Genesys, the company offered an entry-level version named GK series and a simplified WK version named WK-1000/2000.

Generalmusic also produced digital pianos, the Promega series, which attracted more interest than their synthesizer products.

In February 2009 Generalmusic dismissed all employees and immediately filed for bankruptcy, which was declared in 2011.

In December 2014 the Finnish group Soundion Oy Ltd (new owner of GEM, LEM and Elka) announced that, in 2015, Generalmusic will bring to market a product lineup composed of re-issued as well as brand new technology models. The new production is planned to be set up in Finland.

As of July 2015, there were plans to launch a reissue of the classic Elka Synthex synthesizer, and a crowdfounding campaign was set on Indiegogo. Unfortunately it failed to reach the expected funding and the Synthex project seems to have been cancelled.

As of 2021, Generalmusic (Finland) is producing a range of digital pianos branded Gem Promega 2+ using "UpDRAKE" technology which appears to be a further development of the original Generalmusic DRAKE technology for digital organs (US Patent 5,442,128)

References

External links

 Official site

Download resources

Audio equipment manufacturers of Italy
Musical instrument manufacturing companies of Italy
Loudspeaker manufacturers
Synthesizer manufacturing companies of Italy